The Sam Houston Bearkats football statistical leaders are individual statistical leaders of the Sam Houston Bearkats program in various categories, including passing, rushing, receiving, total offense, defensive stats, and kicking. Within those areas, the lists identify single-game, single-season, and career leaders. Through the 2022 season, the Bearkats represented Sam Houston State University in the NCAA Division I FCS WAC–ASUN Challenge; they will upgrade to FBS and join Conference USA in 2023.

Although Sam Houston began competing in intercollegiate football in 1912, the school's official record book considers the "modern era" to have begun in 1950. Records from before this year are often incomplete and inconsistent, and they are generally not included in these lists.

These lists are dominated by more recent players for several reasons:
 Since 1950, seasons have increased from 10 games in length to 11. While a normal FBS regular season now consists of 12 games, the FCS regular season remains at 11 games in most seasons. However, two aspects of the FCS season structure allow for more games in which to accumulate statistics.
 First, the NCAA allows FCS programs to schedule 12 games instead of the regular 11 in years when the period starting with the Thursday before Labor Day and ending with the final Saturday in November contains 14 Saturdays.
 More significantly, FCS conducts a championship tournament, currently known as the NCAA Division I Football Championship. Though the FCS playoffs were first held in 1978, when that grouping was known as Division I-AA, the NCAA did not include playoff games in single-season and career statistics until the 2002 season. From 2002 through 2009, the tournament involved 16 teams. It expanded to 20 teams in 2010, and to its current 24 teams in 2013. However, the 2020–21 season in which Sam Houston won its first and only FCS title saw the playoffs moved from fall 2020 to spring 2021 due to COVID-19 issues, with a bracket of only 16 teams because multiple teams and conferences opted out of a spring season. Currently, a team that advances to the FCS championship game will play either four or five games, depending on whether it receives a first-round bye.
 Due to COVID-19 issues, the NCAA ruled that the 2020 season would not count against the athletic eligibility of any football player, giving everyone who played in that season the opportunity for five years of eligibility instead of the normal four.

These lists are updated through the end of the 2021 season.

Passing

Passing yards

Passing touchdowns

Rushing

Rushing yards

Rushing touchdowns

Receiving

Receptions

Receiving yards

Receiving touchdowns

Total offense
Total offense is the sum of passing and rushing statistics. It does not include receiving or returns.

Total offense yards

Defense

Interceptions

Tackles

Sacks

Kicking

Field goals made

References

Sam Houston